KDBC-TV (channel 4) is a television station in El Paso, Texas, United States, affiliated with CBS and MyNetworkTV. It is owned by Sinclair Broadcast Group alongside Fox affiliate KFOX-TV (channel 14). Both stations share studios on South Alto Mesa Drive in northwest El Paso, while KDBC-TV's transmitter is located atop the Franklin Mountains on the El Paso city limits.

History

Early years
The station first signed on the air on December 14, 1952 as KROD-TV. It was the first television station in the El Paso television market. The station was founded by Dorrance Roderick, owner of KROD radio (600 AM) and the El Paso Times newspaper. KROD-TV's original studio facilities were located at 2201 Wyoming Avenue, currently the home of KSCE (channel 38), now off I-10.

Early programs on the station included the children's shows Red Brown and Anna Lee and Bozo's Big Top. For adults, there was wrestling program Mitchell's Mat Time. The station has been a CBS affiliate since its sign-on, as KROD radio had been a longtime affiliate of the CBS Radio Network. KROD-TV also maintained secondary affiliations with ABC and the DuMont Television Network until 1956. It lost the ABC affiliation when KILT (channel 13; now KVIA-TV on channel 7) became an affiliate of that network in November. KROD-TV lost DuMont when the network ceased operations in August 1956. During the late 1950s, the station was also briefly affiliated with the NTA Film Network. Roderick sold the station to Trigg-Vaughn of Dallas in 1959.

Change to KDBC-TV
The station was sold again in 1967, this time to the Doubleday Broadcasting Company. On May 29, 1973, it changed its call sign to KDBC-TV, reflecting the change in the station's ownership. Doubleday Broadcasting sold the station to Portal Communications, a subsidiary of the Evening Post Publishing Company in 1974.

The original transmitter site was located south of Comanche Peak in El Paso. A road was built to the site, and a  tower was constructed. A building was assembled from the rock chipped from the site. That site is now used as a backup facility for channel 4, and many local FM radio stations transmit from this building.

In 1984, the transmitter was moved farther up the hill to Comanche Peak. A  tower was built and a new transmitter was installed (one of the last of the RCA TT-25GLs to become operable). BTSC stereo also began with the move to the new site.

In 1986, the station was acquired by United Broadcasting, then-owners of KARK-TV in Little Rock, Arkansas and WTOK-TV in Meridian, Mississippi. Columbus, Mississippi-based Imes Broadcasting bought KDBC in 1988 for $33 million after United Broadcasting was taken over by investment firm Merrill Lynch.

Imes began to exit the television business in the late 1990s and announced that they would sell KDBC to Pappas Telecasting in September 2000, who intended to convert the station into a charter affiliate of Azteca América, a fledgling Spanish-language network that was co-owned at the time by Mexican network TV Azteca and Pappas. Plans for the affiliation were canceled following an outcry from viewers, advertisers, and station employees, especially over the fact that no other station in El Paso was interested in joining CBS; most crucially, the Azteca América plan to acquire KXTX-TV in Dallas and use it as the hub of the network fell through, prompting Imes to initially pull KDBC off the market. As a result, the station renewed its affiliation contract with CBS.

On November 17, 2003, two years later, Pappas agreed to buy KDBC from Imes—which had been desiring to sell the station for some time—for $20 million. Pappas began operating KDBC under a time brokerage agreement that same day, with the sale closing on April 2, 2004. Azteca América and Pappas ended their affiliation relationship in mid-2007. Azteca América has been carried on the fourth digital subchannel of ABC affiliate KVIA-TV since early December 2010.

On January 16, 2009, Pappas announced that it would sell several of its television stations, including KDBC, to New World TV Group (later renamed Titan TV Broadcast Group). The sale would be consummated after it received United States bankruptcy court approval.

On October 19, 2009, Communications Corporation of America, owner of NBC affiliate KTSM-TV (channel 9), entered into a shared services agreement with Titan TV for KTSM-TV to provide advertising sales and administrative services as well as some news resources for KDBC-TV. Titan retained KDBC's broadcast license, while both stations would nominally employ separate news departments. However, KTSM-TV was heavily criticized for reducing KDBC's newscasts to near-rebroadcasts with heavy story sharing with its own newscasts. Critics said this made both news departments indistinguishable from one another on-air.

On April 23, 2013, Titan TV Broadcast Group filed an application with the Federal Communications Commission (FCC) to sell KDBC and its low-power repeaters to Cunningham Broadcasting. Nearly all of Cunningham Broadcasting's stock is controlled by trusts held in the names of the children of Sinclair Broadcast Group founder Julian Sinclair Smith. Sinclair had finalized its purchase of Fox affiliate KFOX-TV (channel 14) from the Cox Media Group by this time. For all intents and purposes, this would have created a duopoly in the El Paso market that circumvented FCC ownership rules.

The following day, it was announced that the Communications Corporation of America stations, including KTSM-TV, would be sold to Nexstar Broadcasting Group. The sale of KDBC was consummated on July 31. One week later, Sinclair exercised its option to purchase KDBC outright from Cunningham Broadcasting.

FCC duopoly regulations normally disallow two of the four highest-rated stations (which usually constitute stations affiliated with the "Big Four" networks) from being directly owned by a single entity. However, in this case, Sinclair cited that KDBC is ranked fourth overall in the El Paso market while KFOX-TV placed sixth in total-day viewership. In addition, FCC regulations require a market to be left with eight unique owners after a duopoly is formed. Sinclair noted in its application that the El Paso–Las Cruces market would still have eight unique owners (not counting Mexican stations that also serve the market) after Sinclair completed its acquisition of KDBC. The FCC approved the sale on September 23. The transaction was formally completed on October 1, creating a duopoly between KDBC and KFOX-TV. Despite being longer established, KDBC is considered the junior partner in the duopoly, a rarity for a Big Three network affiliate.

Sinclair announced plans to purchase a new studio facility, using an existing building to house the two stations on South Alto Mesa Drive on the city's west side. The new facility opened at the end of September 2014. Sinclair also announced its intention to invest heavily in KDBC to make it a factor in the market for the first time in several years, bringing its payroll to 40 people.

KDBC-DT2
On February 22, 2006, News Corporation announced the launch of a new "sixth" network called MyNetworkTV, which would be operated by Fox Television Stations and its syndication division 20th Television. MyNetworkTV was created to compete against another upstart network that would launch at the same time that September, The CW (an amalgamated network that originally consisted primarily of UPN and The WB's higher-rated programs) as well as to give UPN and WB stations that were not invited to join The CW to have another option besides converting to independent status. On April 18, Pappas Telecasting signed an affiliation agreement with Fox Entertainment Group for KDBC to serve as the market's charter MyNetworkTV affiliate. KDBC began carrying MyNetworkTV programming on a newly launched second digital subchannel that debuted on September 5, 2006; rather than program a general entertainment format consisting of syndicated content in the style of other MyNetworkTV affiliates (particularly those which carry the service's programming on their main channel), Pappas also signed an affiliation agreement with America One to provide supplementary programming during the remainder of KDBC-DT2's schedule.

On January 1, 2010, KDBC-DT2 became an affiliate of movie and classic television multicast network This TV, while continuing to offer the MyNetworkTV schedule from 7:00 to 9:00 p.m. weeknights. From 2015 to 2017, KDBC-DT2 carried selected sports events from Sinclair's hybrid sports syndication and multicast service American Sports Network, sharing local television rights to selected ASN event content with sister station KFOX's 14.2 subchannel (then affiliated with the Retro Television Network). On March 1, 2017, KDBC-DT2 began carrying Sinclair's internet content network TBD (now focused on acquired linear and internet-originated reality programming) outside of MyNetworkTV programming hours. The subchannel continued to air selected ASN sports programming until August 21, 2017, when KFOX-TV launched its 14.4 subchannel as a full-time affiliate of Stadium (the multicast network successor of ASN, jointly owned by Sinclair and Chicago White Sox subsidiary Silver Chalice).

Programming
KDBC-TV clears most of the CBS network schedule; however, the station airs the CBS Evening News a half-hour earlier than the majority of the network's stations at 5:00 p.m. (this is the reverse order of the traditional late afternoon scheduling of major network affiliates in the Central and Mountain Time Zones, in which the network newscast airs after a local newscast) and airs the network's Sunday morning news programs CBS News Sunday Morning and Face the Nation one hour earlier than most CBS stations (CBS normally feeds the programs starting at 8:00 a.m. in each time zone; KDBC instead transmits both programs live via the network's Eastern Time Zone feed). Current syndicated programs broadcast on KDBC include Jeopardy!, Wheel of Fortune, Inside Edition, and Judge Judy, with all of the programs distributed by CBS Media Ventures.

News operation
KDBC-TV presently broadcasts 24½ hours of locally produced newscasts each week; its early evening newscast airs nightly at 5:30 p.m. instead of as two half-hour broadcasts at 5:00 and 6:00 p.m.

On December 7, 2005, then-anchor Nichole Ayoub was proposed to (accepting the marriage proposal) live during that night's 6:00 p.m. newscast by her boyfriend of several years, Travis Hughes. The event was reported in feature stories seen on ABC's Good Morning America, Inside Edition and by various local television stations around the United States. On December 15, 2009, KDBC became the third television station in the El Paso market to begin broadcasting its newscasts in high definition.

In January 2010, Communications Corporation of America announced that it would shut down the news department of its sister station, KVEO-TV in Brownsville, Texas, other than maintaining a few locally based reporters for stories in the Brownsville area. The locally produced newscast on that station would originate from KDBC, using its staff with reports filed by Brownsville-based reporters. The new newscast, which debuted on KVEO on January 18, 2010, was able to be broadcast live in Brownsville without interfering with the production of KDBC's newscasts due to the one-hour time difference between El Paso (in the Mountain Time Zone) and Brownsville (in the Central Time Zone).

On October 16, 2014, KDBC's news operation was consolidated at the new facilities of sister station KFOX-TV, and re-launched as CBS 4 News. All newscasts will be kept.

On August 17, 2015, KDBC debuted a two-hour weekday morning newscast called CBS 4 News Daybreak from 5 a.m. to 7 a.m., along with the return of the station's newscast at noon.

Technical information

Subchannels
The station's digital signal is multiplexed:

Analog-to-digital conversion 
KDBC-TV shut down its analog signal, over VHF channel 4, on June 2, 2009 (ten days before most full-power television stations in the United States transitioned from analog to digital broadcasts under federal mandate on June 12). The station's digital signal remained on its pre-transition UHF channel 18. Through the use of PSIP, digital television receivers display the station's virtual channel as its former VHF analog channel 4.

Translator

For many years, KDBC has operated low-power translator stations in Alamogordo and Las Cruces. The Alamogordo translator, KKNJ-LP, originally broadcast on channel 71, before relocating to UHF channel 36 in 1989 after the FCC removed high-band UHF channels 70 to 83 from broadcasting use. It changed call letters five times in 2006 to facilitate the warehousing of CW-specific call letters on sister Pappas stations in the Des Moines, Iowa market before the network's September 2006 launch; the station was assigned KCWI-LP for two separate periods, KDMI-LP and then KPWB-LP. Sinclair Broadcast Group surrendered KKNJ-LP's license to the FCC for cancellation on May 7, 2021. The Las Cruces relay, KCWF-LP, originated on UHF channel 61 in the late 1970s; it moved to channel 68 in 1997 and to channel 20 in 2000.

Footnotes

External links 
Official website

CBS network affiliates
MyNetworkTV affiliates
Antenna TV affiliates
TBD (TV network) affiliates
Sinclair Broadcast Group
Television channels and stations established in 1952
DBC-TV
1952 establishments in Texas